Jafar Ashraf Kashani (March 21, 1944 – October 2, 2019) was an Iranian football player. He was scouted by Abbas Ekrami, Shahin F.C.'s founder when he was 16. After Shahin's dissolution, he joined Persepolis F.C. and played until 1974 when he was captain. Then he was employed by Ministry of Foreign Affairs and worked in embassies in Germany and UAE. He was also a member of board of directors at IRIFF and Persepolis. He died on 2 October 2019 due to a heart attack. He was board secretary of Persepolis at the time of his death.

References

External links
 FIFA

1944 births
2019 deaths
People from Tehran
Shahin FC players
Persepolis F.C. players
Iranian footballers
Iran international footballers
Olympic footballers of Iran
Footballers at the 1972 Summer Olympics
Asian Games gold medalists for Iran
Asian Games medalists in football
Footballers at the 1970 Asian Games
Footballers at the 1974 Asian Games
1968 AFC Asian Cup players
1972 AFC Asian Cup players
Association football defenders
Medalists at the 1974 Asian Games
20th-century Iranian people